Rafael Reyes may refer to:

Rafael Reyes, president of Colombia 1904-1909
Rafael Reyes (footballer),  Colombian footballer who competed in the 1972 Summer Olympics
Rafael Reyes (artist), San Diego "cholo goth" artist and musician
Rafael Reyes (wrestler), Dominican-born luchador in Mexico

Places
Rafael Reyes, Cundinamarca, Colombia